Edward Kyung-Rim Na (born February 12, 1996) is a Guamanian soccer player who plays for the Tacoma Stars in the Major Arena Soccer League, as a striker.

Early and personal life
Na was born on Guam and lived there until the age of 11 before moving to Washington in the United States.

Club career
Na played college soccer for Pacific Lutheran University. He turned professional in December 2017 with Tacoma Stars. He was a member of the roster for the 2019–20 season, scoring 2 goals in 9 games.

International career
Na joined a Guam national team training camp in March 2016. He made his international debut later that year.

References

1996 births
Guamanian footballers
Guam international footballers
Association football forwards
Pacific Lutheran Lutes men's soccer players
Tacoma Stars (2003–) players
Living people
Guamanian people of Korean descent
Major Arena Soccer League players